Jacques Fabien Gautier d'Agoty (1716–1785) was a French anatomist, painter and printmaker.

D'Agoty was born in Marseille, and became a pupil of the painter and engraver Jacob Christoph Le Blon, with whom he became a rival for title of the invention of a method of a color-printing method based on etching and mezzotint engraving. He later exploited this process with his four sons: it is significant that he published a journal that included color printed images.

Gautier d'Agoty was elected a member of the Académie des Sciences, Arts et Belles-Lettres de Dijon, he teamed with the physician and anatomist Guichard Joseph Duverney to produce anatomical albums. Together with his son, they produced a French Gallery and universal gallery of portraits of famous men and women, which only appeared in the first deliveries in 1770 and 1772.  D'Agoty died in Paris.

References
 Philip Ball, Bright Earth: Art and the Invention of Color, Farrar, Straus and Giroux, New York, 2001, p. 276.
 Bamber Gascoigne, Milestones in colour printing (1457-1859), Cambridge University press, 1997, p. 12
 John Gorton, A General Biographical Dictionary, Henry G. Bohn, London, vol II, 1851.
 Arthur M. Hind, A History of Engraving and Etching. From the 15th Century to the year 1914. Being the Third and Fully Revised Edition of "A Short History of Engraving and Etching", Dover, New York, 1963, p. 309.
 Sarah Lowengard, 'Jacques-Fabien Gautier, or Gautier d'Agoty' The Creation of Color in Eighteenth Century Europe. New York: Columbia University Press 2006

Online sources 
 Exposition anatomique de la structure du corps humain, 1759 (digitized by Lund University Library)

18th-century French painters
French male painters
1716 births
1785 deaths
Artists from Marseille
French anatomists
18th-century French male artists